The 2015 J.League Cup, also known as the 2015 J.League Yamazaki Nabisco Cup for sponsoring purposes, is the 40th edition of the most prestigious Japanese soccer league cup tournament and the 23rd edition under the current J.League Cup format.

Format
Teams from the J.League Division 1 will take part in the tournament. Gamba Osaka, Kashima Antlers, Kashiwa Reysol and Urawa Red Diamonds were given a bye to the quarter-finals due to qualification in the 2015 AFC Champions League. The remaining 14 teams started from the group stage, where they were divided into two groups of seven. The group winners and the runners-up of each group qualified for the quarter-final along with the four teams which qualified for the AFC Champions League.

Group stage

Group A

Standings

Results

Group B

Standings

Results

Knock-out stage
All times are Japan Standard Time (UTC+9)

Quarterfinals 

|}

Semi-finals

First leg

Second leg

Antlers won 6–2 on aggregate.

Gamba Osaka won 3-2 on aggregate.

Final

Top scorers

Updated to games played on 12 October 2015Source: J.League Data

References

J.League Cup
2015 in Japanese football